David James Speirs (born December 15, 1984) is an Australian politician. He has been a Liberal member of the South Australian House of Assembly since the 2014 state election and leader of the Liberal Party since 19 April 2022. He represented Bright until 2018 and then Black following a redistribution of electoral boundaries. Speirs served as the Minister for Environment and Water in the Marshall Ministry between March 2018 and March 2022.

Background and early career
Speirs was born in Galloway, Scotland, where he was schooled at Kirkcolm Primary School and Stranraer Academy. He emigrated to Australia with his parents and two younger brothers at the age of 17 in 2002.

In 2008 he graduated from the University of Adelaide with a Bachelor of Laws (Honours). He was elected as a councillor and deputy mayor for the Marion City Council, serving between 2010 and 2014. He worked in senior and principal policy development positions within the state Cabinet Office, in the Department of the Premier and Cabinet, between 2008 and 2014.

Speirs was a national director of the Duke of Edinburgh's Award in Australia between 2010 and 2014. In 2012, Speirs was named Young Community Leader of the Year in the Channel 9 Young Achievers Awards.

Parliamentary career
Speirs entered the South Australian Parliament in March 2014, defeating Chloë Fox, Labor's Minister for Transport Services.

In October 2014, Speirs was appointed to the Parliament's Economic and Finance Committee following the resignation of Iain Evans. In January 2016 he was elevated to Steven Marshall's Shadow Cabinet as Shadow Cabinet Secretary. In January 2017, Speirs ascended to the front bench as Shadow Minister for the Environment.

In October 2015, Speirs launched 'Beach for All', a crowd-funded project in partnership with Seacliff Surf Life Saving Club to make Seacliff beach South Australia's first wheelchair accessible beach. The Beach for All access mat was launched on Australia Day 2016.

In March 2018, following the election of the Marshall Government at the South Australian Election, Speirs was sworn in as Minister for Environment and Water.

During his time as Minister, Speirs oversaw significant reform in the portfolio such as the opening up of South Australia's reservoirs for recreational access, the establishment of Green Adelaide and regional landscape boards, significant reduction of water bills and an increase in the land protected as national parks including the creation of Glenthorne National Park in Adelaide's southern suburbs and Australia's biggest national park at the Simpson Desert.

In March 2021, legislation introduced by Speirs meant South Australia became the first state in Australia to ban single-use plastics. The first items to be banned were single-use plastic straws, cutlery and drink stirrers with other items such as polystyrene containers phased out in March 2022.

In November 2021, Speirs contested the deputy party leader and Deputy Premier ballot, but lost to Dan van Holst Pellekaan.

After outgoing Premier Steven Marshall resigned as leader of the Liberal Party, Speirs was elected leader on 19 April 2022, becoming South Australia's 44th Leader of the Opposition.

Personal life
Speirs is an active lifesaver at the Brighton Surf Lifesaving Club and has a strong interest in health and fitness.

He is a founding member of the Hallett Cove-based environmental group, Friends of the Lower Field River; a land care group established by Hallett Cove residents in 2006 to protect and care for the lower portion of the Field River and its environs.

Speirs has completed the Duke of Edinburgh's International Award and has completed all three levels.

See also
Shadow ministry of David Speirs

References

External links
David Speirs MP
David Speirs, Member for Bright

1984 births
Living people
Members of the South Australian House of Assembly
Liberal Party of Australia members of the Parliament of South Australia
University of Adelaide alumni
People educated at Stranraer Academy
Scottish emigrants to Australia
21st-century Australian politicians
Deputy mayors of places in Australia
South Australian local councillors